Magic Dirt is an Australian rock band, which formed in 1991 in Geelong, Victoria, with Daniel Herring on guitar, Adam Robertson on drums, Adalita Srsen on vocals and guitar, and Dean Turner on bass guitar. Initially forming an alternative underground band called Deer Bubbles  which split and formed into the much heavier, rock based group called The Jim Jims, they were renamed as Magic Dirt. Their top 40 releases on the ARIA Albums Chart are Friends in Danger (1996), What Are Rock Stars Doing Today (2000), Tough Love (2003) and Snow White (2005). They have received nine ARIA Music Award nominations including four at the ARIA Music Awards of 1995 for Life Was Better – their second extended play. Turner died in August 2009 of dermatofibrosarcoma protuberans (a soft tissue cancer). From 2010 to November 2018, the band were on hiatus.

History

Early days (1991–1993)
Magic Dirt formed as Deer Bubbles in 1991 in Geelong, Victoria with Adalita Srsen on vocals and guitar, and Dean Turner on bass guitar. Within the same year, they started a new band, with transitory names such as "Detroit", "Brad" and "The Jim Jims", with guitarist Daniel Herring. Using the transitory name, "The Jim Jims", the band recorded a cover version of The Velvet Underground's "Heroin" for a Geelong compilation called Check This Action ... Let the Fun Begin, released in 1992. After the addition of drummer Adam Robertson, they became known as Magic Dirt. Srsen told a fanzine in 1996, "...we used to be in a band before Magic Dirt called Deer Bubbles. Dean knew Daniel from skating, and then he moved in with us, and we'd play like one song for forty minutes, we just loved it. Then we wanted to find a drummer, and we went through about five, then we found Adam through a mutual friend and that was it. We only used to have three songs we used to play for an hour".

Early in 1993, the band supported Sonic Youth and Pavement on their Australian tours. Later in the year, the band issued its debut single, "Supertear", for Fellaheen Records. By the time of its release in July, the band had broken up. However, they soon regrouped and signed with Au Go Go Records in November. Their first extended play, Signs of Satanic Youth appeared in December, with the track "Redhead" receiving airplay on Triple J radio.

The Au Go Go years (1994–1999)

Life Was Better EP
In April 1994, Magic Dirt split however, the group again reformed and released a second EP, Life Was Better in November. The EP included the tracks "Ice" and "Amoxycillin" and debuted at No. 1 on the Australian alternative music chart. It remained on that chart for 75 weeks, eventually selling 20,000 copies. Life Was Better went on to receive four nominations at the ARIA Music Awards of 1995.

In early 1995, the band performed on the Big Day Out festival tour across Australia, with Hole (Magic Dirt also supported their other Australian shows) and Silverchair. The success of Life Was Better had attracted international attention and Geoffrey Weiss, of Warner Music in the United States, traveled to Australia to see the band perform at the Big Day Out. Weiss negotiated a deal with their manager, Gavan Purdy and the band signed a two-album deal with Warner. In August 1995, Daniel Herring left the band. His final recording with the group was the 10" vinyl single, "I Was Cruel", which featured the words "Thankyou, Daniel. Goodbye" etched onto the vinyl. Dave Thomas, of fellow Geelong band Bored!, who had managed Magic Dirt at the early stages of their career, was recruited as Herring's replacement on guitar.

Friends in Danger
In late 1995, Dirt Records released the band's debut album in the US. The album was a compilation of their first two EPs, along with the track "Goofy Gumb", and titled simply Magic Dirt. In March, Magic Dirt began recording their debut album proper, Friends in Danger, in Sydney with Paul McKercher (You Am I) producing. The music style was a reaction to the accessibility of their earlier material. While Warner had expected more songs in the vein of "Ice", the band offered tracks like the 8-minute "Bodysnatcher". Warner were less than impressed, and went so far as to offer the band additional time and money to re-record the album. The band refused, and when Friends in Danger was released in September, the label put little effort into promoting it. According to rock music historian, Ian McFarlane, "[it] matched the band's fearless experimentation with a dark, unhinged sound that went from moments of eerie near-silence to full-tilt guitar noise". Friends in Danger peaked at No. 25 on the ARIA Albums Chart, and went on to sell 10,000 copies in Australia, helped along by "Sparrow", the album's most accessible track.

The group toured North America supporting Archers of Loaf and promoting Friends in Danger later in 1996. Warner still refused to promote the album and they were dropped by the label. Since the band had a two-album deal, Warner paid them for the second album, despite the fact that they did not release it.

Young & Full of the Devil
In January 1997, Magic Dirt again performed on the Big Day Out tour. In July, Thomas left and his replacement on guitar was Spanish-born Raúl Sánchez – former front man of Melbourne band, Muffcake. The group began recording its second full-length record, Young & Full of the Devil, at Birdland Studios with producer Lindsay Gravina. They followed with a three-week tour of the United Kingdom (where they appeared on John Peel's BBC radio show) and continental Europe in the later half of the year. Subway Records in Germany released an updated version of the band's US debut, with new artwork and two additional tracks. The group ended 1997 with a new single, "Rabbit with Fangs", and a national tour supporting Silverchair, playing large arenas around Australia.

April 1998 saw the release of Young & Full of the Devil, which peaked at No. 100. The album continued the unsettling, fuzzy sound of the debut, and sold 10,000 copies in Australia. Another single, "She-Riff" was released – in a new and more polished recording – with a video depicting Srsen re-enacting a scene from the 1975 Australian film Picnic at Hanging Rock.

Young & Full of the Devil was the last release by the band on Au Go Go Records. Turner and Srsen undertook two side projects. The first was Seaville - a project with Mérida Sussex from The Paradise Motel, which issued the Swan Song EP in 1998. The second project was with Ronin System, which resulted in the single, "Expectations" in 1999. Without a label, the band supported themselves by touring throughout much of 1999.

The East West years (2000–2006)

What Are Rockstars Doing Today
In 2000, Magic Dirt signed a recording contract with East West Records, and began recording their third album, What Are Rock Stars Doing Today with Phil Vinall (Placebo) producing. Released in October, What Are Rock Stars Doing Today reached the top 40. It signalled a dramatic shift in the band's sound. Gone were the fuzzy guitars and feedback. In its place was slick production and poppy hooks. Longtime fans of the band weren't sure what to make of lead single, "Dirty Jeans", with its hand claps and sing-a-long chorus. Tracks such as "Pace It" and "City Trash" proved that the band could still rock, however they did receive some backlash, with some fans labelling them "sell-outs". Triple J put "Dirty Jeans" on high rotation and it reached No. 12 in the year's Hottest 100. The year ended with a national tour supporting Powderfinger and Jebediah.

2001 and 2002 saw the band touring in the wake of What Are Rock Stars Doing Today. They launched their Love Ya & Leave Ya Tour - the largest the group had done up until that point – which saw them on their first trip to New Zealand. The City Trash Tour with The Nation Blue and Girls Against Boys followed in June–July 2002. They started recording demos for a fourth album early in the year – tracks such as "Love Me" and "Sarah May" from these sessions were later released as B-sides. Later that year, the band made its second trip to the UK, where What Are Rockstars Doing Today had been released on Sweet Nothing Records. In 2002, Magic Dirt appeared on the "World of Instruments" segment of John Safran's Music Jamboree, where they played "Dirty Jeans" using Indonesian gamelans – struck instruments including metallophones and xylophones.

Tough Love
In early 2003 Magic Dirt started recording its fourth album, Tough Love, at Birdland Studios in Melbourne, again produced by Lindsay Gravina. It was released in August and peaked at No. 15. It carried on the band's new slicker sound, although tracks like the epic "Brat" recalled the band's early days. Originally, no commercial singles were to be released from the album. After the success of the radio-only singles "Vulcanella" and "Watch Out Boys", "Plastic Loveless Letter" was officially released. It became the band's biggest hit to date, reaching No. 34 on the ARIA Singles Chart. Tough Love was nominated at the ARIA Music Awards of 2003 for Best Rock Album. It was re-issued in 2004 as two disc set containing their Live at the Wireless session on Triple J in 2003.

In 2004, Sánchez issued a solo album, Midnight Woolf, a self-recorded swamp blues instrumental release on his own Crossbone Recording Company. Sánchez formed the Midnight Woolf band and performed several gigs in Melbourne. In August, Turner produced the debut album, Peapod, for Sydney-based group, theredsunband.

Snow White

In September 2005, Magic Dirt released their fifth studio album, Snow White, which peaked into the top 30.
 It received critical acclaim, as a combination of the band's pop sound, their noisy early material, and new elements such as acoustic guitars. Lead single "Locket" made an impact on radio and music video channels, but its exposure was limited due to the explicit language in the song's chorus. "I Love the Rain" followed as the second single from the album. Neither single charted into the top 50.

Speaking about the album, Snow White is far more mellow and less angst-ridden than 2003's Tough Love. Adalita Srsen told The Age "We're growing up more and you let go of those feelings, you're over and done with certain things and you don't go back there. So there's a lot of intense, deep feeling on the new record but it's not necessarily coming from an angry viewpoint. A lot of the album's about beauty and that's what I wanted to do, make a beautiful album."

Aside from joining the Big Day Out tour again in January and February, 2006 was a quiet year for the band. Sánchez continued his work with Midnight Woolf. He re-assembled the band in Spain for a series of gigs, and they released a second album, Electric Deluxe Graveyard Blues. Later in the year, two Magic Dirt tracks, "Sucker Love" (B-side to "Locket") and "Daddy" (from Life Was Better) appeared on the soundtrack for the Australian film Suburban Mayhem, plus a track from theredsunband, which had been produced by Turner. Also included were two solo contributions from Srsen, covers of "Sex Beat" and "Double Dare". "Double Dare" was released as a single in October. The tracks, produced by Mick Harvey (member of Nick Cave and the Bad Seeds, producer for PJ Harvey), were the first solo material to appear from Srsen. Turner, Harvey and Rowland S. Howard also played on the tracks.

Emergency Music (2006–2009)
After leaving East West, Magic Dirt created their own label, Emergency Music in 2006. In October, Srsen announced the band's future activities, in an interview on Triple J's breakfast show. The band would release an EP, a mini-album, and then an album. A report in Sydney street press Drum Media, indicated that the EP would be given away at shows and sold in selected independent music stores. The EP featured covers of The Scientists' "We Had Love" and Nick Cave and the Bad Seeds' "Stagger Lee", as well as a live re-recording of "Mother's Latest Fear" from Snow White.

In 2007, the band embarked on two separate projects; an experimental all noise album Roky's Room EP and a heavier dark rock mini album, Beast. Both were released on the band's own label Emergency Music in mid-2007. Beast harked back to the band's earlier, rawer material and featured original guitarist Herring on two tracks ("Horror Me" and a re-recording of "Sucker Love"). The single, "Bring Me the Head Of...", made little impact on radio, including Triple J, which had previously supported the band. The group spent the remainder of 2007 touring in support of Beast, including an East Coast tour with The Beasts Of Bourbon – who were often joined on stage by Srsen – and Rowland S. Howard.

In November 2007, the band began recording their sixth full-length album, Girl, which was released in July 2008. The album debuted at No. 7 on the Australian Independent Music chart. However, it did not reach the ARIA Albums Chart top 50. "Romy", lead single from the album, also failed to reach the related singles chart top 50. In support of the album, the group embarked on the No Sleep Til Christmas Tour, starting in July and ending in December 2008. The tour included dates in all major Australian cities, and a number of shows in regional centres. Playing bass on this tour was Melbourne musician Matt Sonic, as Turner was too ill to tour. To coincide with the tour, the band released a limited edition tour EP, available only at the shows. The second in a series of tour EPs (the first being the giveaway EP from 2006), the disc featured a cover of Hard-Ons' "Suck N Swallow", a collaboration with Gareth Liddiard of The Drones, two outtakes left over from Girl and a track recorded at Birdland Studios in 2003.

Death of Dean Turner and hiatus (2009–2011)
Dean Turner died on 21 August 2009 of dermatofibrosarcoma protuberans, a rare form of tissue cancer. He was 37 years old. Turner had been diagnosed nine years earlier. After Turner died, the band released a statement:

Following Turner's death Magic Dirt performed a final tour in honour of his memory, culminating in their appearance at the 2010 Big Day Out festival. They also released a six-track EP, White Boy, in November 2009. Srsen embarked on a successful solo career, while Sánchez formed a new band called River of Snakes.:

Reunion (2018–present)
In February 2018, Magic Dirt played a surprise small set at the end of an Adalita solo show at the Barwon Club in Geelong. In June 2018, the band were announced as a part of the 2019 Hotter Than Hell concert tour alongside Spiderbait, Shihad, Bodyjar and 28 Days. The band played their first official show since 2010 on November 18, 2018, at the River Rocks Rehab festival at the Barwon Club in Geelong.

In December 2018, the band were inducted into the National Live Music Awards Hall of Fame as the inaugural Live Legends. At the event, they told the crowd it was the first award of their career. February 2019 saw the band play alongside You Am I at Taronga Zoo Sydney, and in March as part of Golden Plains Festival with The Jesus and Mary Chain, Liz Phair, Happy Mondays and Four Tet. In late 2019, the band toured as part of the Scene and Heard festival alongside The Dandy Warhols, Jebediah, Wolfmother and Eskimo Joe.

The band were scheduled to perform at several festivals across Australia in 2020 and 2021, but many of these were cancelled or rescheduled due to the COVID-19 pandemic. They are scheduled to perform at several dates of the 2022 Spring Loaded Festival.

With a large portion of their back catalogue out of print, the band also announced in November 2018 that they would be reissuing their Signs Of Satanic Youth EP, on vinyl, CD and digitally, in January 2019. The reissue campaign continued with Life Was Better (available on vinyl and streaming services for the first time) in January 2020, a 20th anniversary edition of What Are Rocks Stars Doing Today in October 2020, and Friends In Danger in July 2021. The reissue of Friends In Danger reached number 10 on the ARIA Albums Chart, their highest chart entry to date.

Members
Current members
Adalita Srsen – vocals, guitar (1991–2011, 2018–present)
Raúl Sánchez – guitar (1997–2011, 2018–present)

Current touring musicians
Steve Patrick – bass (2009–2011, 2018–present)
Dan McKay – drums (2022–present)

Former members
 Daniel Herring  – guitar (1991-1995)
 Dave Thomas  – guitar (1995–1997; d. 23 March 2020)
Dean Turner – bass guitar (1991–2009, d. 21 August 2009)
Adam Robertson – drums (1992–2011, 2018–2022)

Discography

Albums

Studio albums

Compilation albums

Extended plays

Singles

Notes

Album appearances

Awards and nominations

AIR Awards
The Australian Independent Record Awards (commonly known informally as AIR Awards) is an annual awards night to recognise, promote and celebrate the success of Australia's Independent Music sector. (The commenced in 2006)

|-
| AIR Awards of 2008
|Girl 
| Best Independent Hard Rock/Punk Album
|

ARIA Music Awards
The ARIA Music Awards is an annual awards ceremony that recognises excellence, innovation, and achievement across all genres of Australian music. Magic Dirt have been nominated for 9 awards.

|-
| rowspan="4"| 1995
| rowspan="4"| Life Was Better
| Best New Talent
| 
|-
| Breakthrough Artist - Single
| 
|-
| Best Independent Release
| 
|-
| Best Alternative Release
| 
|-
|  2001
| What Are the Rock Stars Doing Today
| Best Alternative Release
| 
|-
| rowspan="3"| 2003
| Tough Love
| Best Rock Album
| 
|-
| Adalita and Steven Gorrow for Tough Love
| Best Cover Art
| 
|-
| Lindsay Gravina for Tough Love
| Engineer of the Year
| 
|-
|  2006
| Lindsay Gravina and Magic Dirt for Snow White
| Producer of the Year
|

National Live Music Awards
The National Live Music Awards (NLMAs) are a broad recognition of Australia's diverse live industry, celebrating the success of the Australian live scene. The awards commenced in 2016.

|-
| National Live Music Awards of 2018
| Magic Dirt
| Live Legends (Hall of Fame)
| 
|-

References

General
  Note: Archived [on-line] copy has limited functionality.
Specific

External links
Official website

Magic Dirt page at Warner Music
Magic Dirt history J-File
 

Australian indie rock groups
Musical groups from Geelong
Pub rock musical groups
Man's Ruin Records artists
Au Go Go Records artists